Kunath Venu Madhav (died 25 September 2019) was an Indian actor, television presenter, mimicry artist and comedian known for his works predominantly in Telugu cinema.  He was one of the finest comedians in the Telugu cinema, he starred in some 500 films in a variety of roles, starting his career as an impressionist; imitating celebrities, politicians, and local dialects.  He received breakthrough in cinema with works such as Master (1997), and Tholi Prema (1998).

In 2006, he received the state Nandi Award for Best Male Comedian for his work in the action comedy Lakshmi. He won two CineMAA Awards for best comedian for his work in V. V. Vinayaks' romantic comedy Dil (2003); and  S. S. Rajamouli's sports comedy Sye (2004).

Early life
Venu Madhav was born in Kodad in Suryapet district of Telangana. He was married to Sree Vanisri and has two sons.

Death
He died on 25 September 2019 at Yashoda Hospitals, Secunderabad, due to liver and kidney complications.

Selected filmography

Actor

As dubbing artist

Notes

References

External links

2019 deaths
Male actors in Telugu cinema
Nandi Award winners
Telugu male actors
Ventriloquists
Telugu comedians
Slapstick comedians
Indian impressionists (entertainers)
Indian game show hosts
20th-century Indian male actors
21st-century Indian male actors
Indian male comedians
Male actors from Telangana
Deaths from kidney disease
Year of birth uncertain
People from Suryapet district